The 1987 Boise State Broncos football team represented Boise State University in the 1987 NCAA Division I-AA football season. The Broncos competed in the Big Sky Conference and played their home games on campus at Bronco Stadium in Boise, Idaho. The Broncos were led by first-year head coach Skip Hall, Boise State finished the season 6–5 overall and 4–4 in conference.

Schedule

References

Boise State
Boise State Broncos football seasons
Boise State Broncos football